Proverbs 17 is the seventeenth chapter of the Book of Proverbs in the Hebrew Bible or the Old Testament of the Christian Bible. The book is a compilation of several wisdom literature collections, with the heading in 1:1 may be intended to regard Solomon as the traditional author of the whole book, but the dates of the individual collections are difficult to determine, and the book probably obtained its final shape in the post-exilic period. This chapter is a part of the second collection of the book.

Text
The original text is written in Hebrew language. This chapter is divided into 28 verses.

Textual witnesses
Some early manuscripts containing the text of this chapter in Hebrew are of the Masoretic Text, which includes the Aleppo Codex (10th century), and Codex Leningradensis (1008).

There is also a translation into Koine Greek known as the Septuagint, made in the last few centuries BC. Extant ancient manuscripts of the Septuagint version include Codex Vaticanus (B; B; 4th century), Codex Sinaiticus (S; BHK: S; 4th century), and Codex Alexandrinus (A; A; 5th century).

Analysis
This chapter belongs to a section regarded as the second collection in the book of Proverbs (comprising Proverbs 10:1–22:16), also called "The First 'Solomonic' Collection" (the second one in Proverbs 25:1–29:27). The collection contains 375 sayings, each of which consists of two parallel phrases, except for Proverbs 19:7 which consists of three parts.

Verse 1
The word “sacrifices” in relation to "house" may suggest a connection with the Temple (as in Proverbs 7:14) where people offer sacrifices, such as "peace offerings", and had plenty amount meat left over. It can also simply refer to a 'sumptuous meal' (Deuteronomy 12:15; Isaiah 34:6; Ezekiel 39:17) as in festivals.
The general idea is that a modest meal with peace and harmony ('quietness') round the table is better than a festive meal filled with resentments and rivalries or even open quarrels (cf. Proverbs 15:17).

Verse 5Whoever mocks the poor reproaches his Maker,and he who is glad at calamities will not be unpunished. 
"Reproaches": from the Hebrew word , kheref, meaning “taunt” (as with a cutting taunt) or “insults” (NET Bible); in this case it may mean "showing contempt for" or "insulting" God, blaming God’s providential control of the world or "offending the divine nature" of poverty by holding it up as a personal failure (cf. Proverbs 14:31).

Verse 28Even a fool, when he holds his peace, is counted wise;and he who shuts his lips is esteemed a man of understanding.''
"Esteemed a man of understanding": in Hebrew is using the Niphal participle in the declarative or estimative sense with stative verbs: “to be discerning” (Qal) becoming “to be declared discerning” (Niphal).
As 'silence is a mark of wisdom', a fool who could observe "restraint in speech" and "cool in spirit" (verse 27), instead of being 'hot-tempered' (cf. Proverbs 15:18), can conceal his/her folly and even be regarded as a wise person.

See also

Related Bible parts: Deuteronomy 12, Proverbs 7, Proverbs 15, Proverbs 22, Isaiah 34, Ezekiel 39

References

Sources

External links
 Jewish translations:
 Mishlei - Proverbs - Chapter 17 (Judaica Press) translation [with Rashi's commentary] at Chabad.org
 Christian translations:
 Online Bible at GospelHall.org (ESV, KJV, Darby, American Standard Version, Bible in Basic English)
 Book of Proverbs Chapter 17 King James Version
  Various versions

17